Bergen Generating Station is a gas-fired power plant owned and operated by Public Service Electric and Gas Company (PSE&G). It located on the banks of Overpeck Creek near its confluence with the Hackensack River in Ridgefield in Bergen County, New Jersey, United States. Within the New Jersey Meadowlands, it is adjacent to the Little Ferry Yard.

The plant supplies electricity to New Jersey and, via the Hudson Project, to New York City.

The cooling tower make-up water is furnished by BCUA Bergen County Utilities Authority, eliminating the need for utilizing potable water.

See also
List of power stations in New Jersey

References

External links 
Emissions 2011
Hudson Project

Buildings and structures in Bergen County, New Jersey
New Jersey Meadowlands District
Natural gas-fired power stations in New Jersey
Coal-fired power stations in New Jersey
Ridgefield, New Jersey
New York City infrastructure
Public Service Enterprise Group